An operator is a professional designation used in various industries,  including broadcasting (in television and radio), computing, power generation and transmission, customer service, physics, and construction.  Operators are day-to-day end users of systems, that may or may not be mission-critical, but are typically managed and maintained by technicians or engineers.  They might also work on a 24-hour rotating shift schedule.

Types of operators 
Broadcasting 
 Technical operator, transmission controller or broadcast operator:
 Master control (MCR) operator
 Production control room (PCR) operator
 Transmission control room (TCR) operator
 Video tape operator (VTO)
 Certified Television Operator (CTO) by Society of Broadcast Engineers (SBE)
 Certified Radio Operator (CRO) operator - by (SBE)
 Studio technical operator (gallery operator):
 Vision mixer operator - technical director (TD)
 Sound and comms (talkback) studio operator

Camera operator
 Jib (camera) operator
 Boom operator
 Dolly grip operator

Other
 Computer operator
 Network operations center (NOC) operator
 Crane operator
 Radio operator
 Satellite controller
 Switchboard operator
 Winch operator
 Nuclear power plant operator

Gallery

References

Occupations 
Broadcasting occupations